Nikola Žižić (born 23 January 1988) is a Croatian professional footballer who last played as a defender for Greek club AEL.

Career
Physically strong and good at initiating attacks and finishing them, Žižić started his career in second- and third-tier clubs in Croatia and Slovenia – Solin, Konavljanin and Bela Krajina before getting his chance to play in Prva HNL for the newly promoted Lučko, signing a one-year deal. Establishing himself in the first team, he secured a transfer to the Turkish Süper Lig team Antalyaspor, signing a three-year deal with them. After a short period in Turkey and Fethiyespor he returned to Slovenia and played for NK Krka before signing with Croatian side Istra where he had his most successful seasons with 63 league games.

On 7 July 2017, AEL announced the signing of Žižić on a two-year contract. On 20 December 2018, he scored his first goal for the club in a 4–0 away win against Apollon Pontou for the Greek Cup, helping his team secure a spot in the round of 16.

On 9 January 2019, he scored with a long free-kick in a 3–2 home win against Asteras Tripolis for the Greek Cup round of 16. Two weeks later, in the rematch, Nikola temporarily equalized the scoreline with another free-kick, before his team collapsed and conceded 2 goals in less than 10 minutes, losing 7–6 on aggregate and being eliminated from the quarter finals. On 14 May 2021 there was an official announcement about the termination of the player's contract by mutual agreement.

Career statistics

Club

References

External links
 

1989 births
Living people
Footballers from Split, Croatia
Association football central defenders
Croatian footballers
NK Solin players
NK Konavljanin players
NK Bela Krajina players
NK Lučko players
Antalyaspor footballers
Fethiyespor footballers
NK Krka players
NK Istra 1961 players
Athlitiki Enosi Larissa F.C. players
Croatian Football League players
Slovenian Second League players
Süper Lig players
TFF First League players
Slovenian PrvaLiga players
First Football League (Croatia) players
Super League Greece players
Croatian expatriate footballers
Expatriate footballers in Slovenia
Croatian expatriate sportspeople in Slovenia
Expatriate footballers in Turkey
Croatian expatriate sportspeople in Turkey
Expatriate footballers in Greece
Croatian expatriate sportspeople in Greece